Oblivious may refer to:

 Obliviousness, a mental state
 Oblivious (British TV series), a hidden camera comedy game show, 2001–2003
 Oblivious (American game show)
 Oblivious (film), a 2001 short film directed by Ozgur Uyanik
 "Oblivious" (Aztec Camera song), 1983
 "Oblivious" (Kalafina song), 2008
 Re/oblivious, a 2008 remix mini-album by Kalafina

See also
Oblivion (disambiguation)